The 1960 LPGA Championship was the sixth LPGA Championship, held July 1–4 at Sheraton Hotel Country Club in French Lick, Indiana.

Mickey Wright won the second of her four LPGA Championships, three strokes ahead of Louise Suggs, the 1957 winner.  Defending champion Betsy Rawls finished nine strokes back in third place. It was the fourth of thirteen major titles for Wright.

The course was designed by Donald Ross; it opened in 1917 and was originally known as the "Hill Course." It hosted the PGA Championship in 1924, the second of five won by Walter Hagen and the first of four consecutive. It is now named the "Donald Ross Course." It was the second consecutive year for the LPGA Championship at the course.

Past champions in the field

Source:

Final leaderboard
Monday, July 4, 1960

Source:

References

Women's PGA Championship
Golf in Indiana
LPGA Championship
LPGA Championship
LPGA Championship
LPGA Championship
Women's sports in Indiana